Reine Claes-Göran Brynolfsson (born 15 January 1953) is a Swedish actor. He was born in Gothenburg.

Filmography

References

External links 
 
 

1953 births
20th-century Swedish male actors
21st-century Swedish male actors
Eugene O'Neill Award winners
Litteris et Artibus recipients
Living people
People from Gothenburg
Best Actor Robert Award winners